This paleomammalogy list records new  fossil mammal taxa that were described during the year 2015, as well as notes other significant paleomammalogy discoveries and events which occurred during that year.

General research
 Description of exceptionally preserved specimens of the pantodont species Alcidedorbignya inopinata and a study of its phylogenetic relationships is published by De Muizon et al. (2015).
 A study on the phylogenetic relationships of the family Nyctitheriidae based on new fossil remains of Plagioctenodon rosei and Plagioctenodon thewisseni is published by Manz et al. (2015). 
 Studies of the phylogenetic relationships of litopterns and notoungulates within Placentalia, indicating that their closest living relatives are odd-toed ungulates, are published by Welker et al. (2015) and Buckley (2015).
 A study of the phylogenetic relationships of the Pleistocene camelid genus Camelops, based on genomic data extracted from its bones, is published by Heintzman et al. (2015).
 A study on the feeding habits of extant and fossil members of the family Canidae belonging to the tribe Canini, as indicated by skull size and shape, is published by Meloro, Hudson & Hook (2015).
 A study on the population dynamics of the cave lion (Panthera spelaea) during the Late Pleistocene is published by Ersmark et al. (2015).
 Description of tarsals attributed to Purgatorius and a study on the phylogenetic relationships of this mammal is published by Chester et al. (2015).
 A study on the age of the holotype specimen of Darwinius masillae at the time of death and on the life history of the species is published by López-Torres, Schillaci & Silcox (2015).
 Cranial endocast of Victoriapithecus macinessi is reconstructed by Gonzales et al. (2015).
 A study evaluating the evidence of association between extinctions or replacements of large mammals in the Northern Hemisphere in the Late Pleistocene with warming events is published by Cooper et al. (2015).

Metatherians

Eutherians

Xenarthrans

Afrotherians

Bats

Odd-toed ungulates

Even-toed ungulates

Cetaceans

Carnivorans

Rodents

Primates

Other eutherians

Other mammals

References

2015 in paleontology
Prehistoric mammals